Qatar Post (formerly Q-Post) is the national provider of postal services in Qatar. Its headquarters building, the General Post Office, has been on the Doha Corniche since 1988.

The company was established in 1950 as the General Postal Corporation and the country's first post office opened in Doha that same year. At first, in compliance with treaty obligations, British stamps were in use. These were issued in Indian rupee denominations with QATAR over-printed in English. The first date-stamp was used for registered letters at Doha Post Office on 17 May 1953. Additional post offices were opened at Dukhan in 1956 and at Umm Said in 1960.

In 2009, it was announced that Qatar had won the bid to host the 25th Universal Postal Union Congress (UPU) in 2012. The event was held from September to October 2012.

Qatar Post has been part of the Ministry of Transport and Communication since 2013 and is exclusively the national provider of postal services in the country. The service has seen considerable expansion. There were only three direct dispatches of overseas mail in 1963 and this had increased to well over 100 by 2018. The country has more than 130 post-boxes with daily collections. Qatar Post operates the country's largest vehicle fleet, ranging from motor bikes to large trucks.

See also
 Postage stamps and postal history of Qatar

References

External links
 Official website

Philately of Qatar
Communications in Qatar
Government-owned companies of Qatar
Postal organizations